Rosemarie Neuser (born 22 March 1955) is a German former footballer who played as a goalkeeper. She made eight appearances for the Germany national team from 1984 to 1987.

References

External links
 

1955 births
Living people
German women's footballers
Women's association football goalkeepers
Germany women's international footballers
Place of birth missing (living people)